Leo Englund (born 16 April 1991) is a Swedish footballer who plays for Gefle IF as a forward.

References

External links

1991 births
Living people
Association football forwards
GIF Sundsvall players
Swedish footballers
Allsvenskan players
Superettan players
Ettan Fotboll players
Sandvikens IF players
Skellefteå FF players